This is a list of tunnels documented by the Historic American Engineering Record in the U.S. state of New Jersey.

Tunnels

See also
 List of bridges documented by the Historic American Engineering Record in New Jersey

References

List
New York (state) transportation-related lists
Lists of buildings and structures in New Jersey
New Jersey
New Jersey transportation-related lists